Grubbing or clearing is the removal of trees, shrubs, stumps and rubbish from a site. This is often at the site where a transportation or utility corridor, a road or power line, an edifice or a garden is to be constructed. Grubbing is performed following clearance of trees to their stumps, preceding construction.

In animal behaviour grubbing is a feeding technique, referring to digging and uprooting of roots and rhizomes of plants. It is employed by geese, especially greater and lesser snow geese and Canada geese, as well as swine.

References 

Civil engineering